This is a list of notable people whose ancestry has been traced to Gujarat, India.

Arts and entertainment

Gujarat's British royalty connection
In June 2013, Gujarat came to the media fore when it was discovered that the British monarchy have Indian mitochondrial DNA traced through Princess Diana which has been maternally inherited by both her sons, Prince William and Prince Harry. The connection traces back eight generations, to Eliza Kewark, who was housekeeper to Prince William's ancestor Theodore Forbes, born in 1788, a Scottish merchant from a landowning family who had travelled to India to work for the East India Company in Surat, a port north of Bombay. The DNA was passed down through Eliza's daughters and granddaughters to Princess Diana.  Eliza is variously described in contemporary documents as "a dark-skinned native woman", "an Armenian woman from Bombay", and "Mrs. Forbesian". Genealogist William Addams Reitwiesner assumed she was Armenian. In June 2013, BritainsDNA announced that genealogical DNA tests on two of William's distant cousins in the same direct maternal line confirm that Eliza Kewark was of Indian descent, via her direct maternal line.

See also
List of Gujarati poets
Lists of Indians by state
List of Parsis

References

|}

Gujarat
 
Lists of people from Gujarat